When I Was Young is the second EP by Danish singer-songwriter MØ, released on 26 October 2017 by Sony Music.

Tour 
MØ has embarked on the When I Was Young Tour. The tour ran from 4 November to 26 November 2017, mostly in Asia. Shows in Australia were part of Sia's tour.

Track listing
Credits adapted from Tidal.

Charts

References

2017 EPs
MØ albums
Sony Music albums